Tralee IT GAA was the GAA team in the Institute of Technology, Tralee, Ireland. They played Gaelic football, hurling, ladies' Gaelic football and camogie. On 1 January 2021, Tralee IT (now known as MTU Kerry) merged with Cork IT to become Munster Technological University.

Gaelic football
The football club competes in the Sigerson Cup and Higher Education Leagues as well as the McGrath Cup.
The Ladies football team play in the O'Connor Cup and Higher Education Leagues.

History
IT Tralee (formerly known as Tralee RTC (Regional Technical College) made a mark on the college GAA scene in 1997 when it became the first RTC to win the Sigerson Cup. It was only Tralee's second outing in this  competition. However, the college created further history by winning the Sigerson three times in successive seasons to become the only RTC/Institute of Technology to do so in the competition's history.

The Ladies football team also won the O'Connor Cup back to back in 1998 and 1999.

Winning Sigerson Cup captains
 Éamon Ferris 1997
 Michael Cloherty 1998
 Jim McGuinness 1999

Notable footballers
 Colm Cooper
 Michael Donnellan
 Noel Garvan
 Pádraic Joyce
 Tom McLoughlin
 Seamus Moynihan
 Colm Parkinson
 Mike Frank Russell

Hurling
The Hurling club play in the Ryan Cup and Higher Education Leagues and the Waterford Crystal Cup.

History
IT Tralee won the Ryan Cup in 1997, 2007, 2011. The camogie team won the Purcell Shield in 1997.

Honours

Notable hurlers
 James O'Brien
 Eoin Ryan
 Nicky Quaid
 John Carroll
 Kevin Tucker
 John Healy
 Seamus Prendergast
 John Reddan
 Niall Gilligan
 Alan Markham

Camogie
The camogie team play in the Purcell Shield.

Interesting facts

ITT Senior Football team win first Sigerson Cup in 1997 and go on to win 3 in a row.
ITT Ladies Football team win first O'Connor Cup in 1998 and go on to win 2 in a row.
ITT Senior Hurling team win first Ryan Cup in 1997.
ITT Camogie team win first Purcell Shield in 1997.
ITT win debut McGrath Cup game beating inter-county opposition Waterford away in 2005. Score 2-08 to 0-09.
ITT Senior Hurling team win their second Ryan Cup in 2007 ten years after first winning it.
ITT's Deirdre O' Reilly wins an All Ireland medal as well as an All Star award for her achievements with the Cork senior ladies' football team.
ITT Fresher Football team win 2 in a row All Ireland league titles in 2007 and 2008.
ITT Senior Hurling team compete in Fitzgibbon Cup for first time in 1998.
Eoin Ryan becomes the first ITT hurler to make the Fitzgibbon Cup All Star team.
ITT Senior Football and Hurling teams entering into Intercounty Competitions (McGrath Cup & Waterford Crystal Cup).
ITT opened a new Gaa Pitch in 07/08.

References

Gaelic games clubs in County Kerry
Gaelic football clubs in County Kerry
Hurling clubs in County Kerry
Regional Technical College Gaelic games clubs